Edith Forne (d. after 1129), was an English noblewoman who was the concubine of King Henry I of England and the foundress of Osney Abbey near Oxford.

She was the daughter of Forn Sigulfson, Lord of Greystoke, Cumberland.

Edith had three children by King Henry: 
 Robert FitzEdith, (1093–1172) who married Maud d'Avranches. They had one daughter, Maud, who married Renaud, Sire of Courtenay (son of Miles, Sire of Courtenay and Ermengarde of Nevers).
 William de Tracy (1097–1140).
 Adeliza FitzEdith who appears in charters with her brother, Robert.

In 1120, Henry caused Edith to marry Robert D'Oyly the younger, second son of Nigel D'Oyly. As a marriage portion, she was granted the Manor of Cleydon, Buckinghamshire. Robert and Edith had at least two children: Henry, buried at Osney in 1163, and Gilbert.

In 1129, Edith persuaded her husband to build the Church of St Mary, in the Isle of Osney, near Oxford Castle, for the use of Augustine Canons: this was to become Osney Abbey.  She told him that she had dreamt of the chattering of magpies, interpreted by a chaplain as souls in Purgatory who needed a church founding to expiate their sins.

Edith was buried in Osney Abbey, in a religious habit, as John Leland describes upon seeing her tomb as it was on the eve of the Dissolution: ‘Ther lyeth an image of Edith, of stone, in th' abbite of a vowess, holding a hart in her right hand, on the north side of the high altaire’. The legendary dream of magpies was painted near the tomb.

References

11th-century births
Anglo-Normans
People from Oxford
Year of death unknown
Henry I of England
Anglo-Norman women
12th-century English people
11th-century English people
11th-century English women
12th-century English women
People from Greystoke, Cumbria